Fairy Holes Cave  is a Site of Special Scientific Interest in the Wear Valley district of west County Durham, England. It is located on the western flanks of Snowhope Moor, on the right bank of Westernhope Burn, some 3 km south-west of the village of Eastgate.

The cave is the longest known stream passage in the Yoredale Limestone of the North Pennines and the best developed example of its type. The Geological Conservation Review classes it as being of national importance.

References

Sites of Special Scientific Interest in County Durham
Caves of County Durham